The Montgomery–Åsberg Depression Rating Scale (MADRS) is a ten-item diagnostic questionnaire which psychiatrists use to measure the severity of depressive episodes in patients with mood disorders.  It was designed in 1979 by British and Swedish researchers (Marie Åsberg) as an adjunct to the Hamilton Rating Scale for Depression (HAMD) which would be more sensitive to the changes brought on by antidepressants and other forms of treatment than the Hamilton Scale was.  There is, however, a high degree of statistical correlation between scores on the two measures.

Interpretation
The questionnaire includes questions on ten symptoms:
 Apparent sadness
 Reported sadness
 Inner tension
 Reduced sleep
 Reduced appetite
 Concentration difficulties
 Lassitude
 Inability to feel
 Pessimistic thoughts
 Suicidal thoughts

Each item yields a score of 0 to 6; the overall score thus ranges from 0 to 60.
Higher MADRS score indicates more severe depression.
Usual cutoff points are:
0 to 6: normal /symptom absent
7 to 19: mild depression
20 to 34: moderate depression
35 to 60: severe depression.

MADRS-S
A self-rating version of this scale (MADRS-S) is often used in clinical practice and correlates reasonably well with expert ratings. The MADRS-S instrument has nine questions, with an overall score ranging from 0 to 54 points.

See also 
 Comprehensive Psychopathological Rating Scale
 Diagnostic classification and rating scales used in psychiatry

References

External links
 Automatically scored digital version of the MADRS
 Full version of the Montgomery–Åsberg Depression Rating Scale
 Side-by-side comparison of the MADRS and HAMD

Depression screening and assessment tools